Calosoma elegans is a species of ground beetle in the family Carabidae. It is found in Kazakhstan, Kyrgyzstan, and China.

Subspecies
These five subspecies belong to the species Calosoma elegans:
 Calosoma elegans elegans (Kirsch, 1859)  (China and Kazakhstan)
 Calosoma elegans karagaicum (Lapouge, 1924)  (Kyrgyzstan)
 Calosoma elegans manderstjernae (Ballion, 1871)  (Kazakhstan and Kyrgyzstan)
 Calosoma elegans semenovii (Motschulsky, 1860)  (Kazakhstan)
 Calosoma elegans subtilestriatum Mandl, 1954  (China)

References

elegans
Beetles described in 1859
Insects of Central Asia